Barmas is name of a locality in district Gilgit, Gilgit−Baltistan, Pakistan. It is one of the oldest settlements in the Gilgit District. Barmas is divided into two units(محلہ), Barmas pine(برمس پائین) and Barmas Bala(برمس بالا). Barmas Gah is a stream that departs from the namesake "Khur"  means a source of fresh water, can afford water supply to Gilgit including the localities nearby.

See also
 Dadi Jawari

References

Populated places in Gilgit District